Bell Street Chapel is an historic Unitarian Universalist chapel church located at 5 Bell Street in Providence, Rhode Island. This is just off Broadway in the part of the city referred to as "Federal Hill." The church is a member congregation of the Unitarian Universalist Association (UUA).

History
The chapel was built in 1875 by architect William Russell Walker at the behest of James Eddy. Eddy was a wealthy engraver and art dealer who advocated a theology that was unusual for its time. He had a private chapel built on the land adjacent to his property, hoping that he might be able to find some people who agreed with his theology.

The chapel sat largely unused until Eddy's death in 1888. His will created an endowment aimed at keeping the chapel in use well into the future. That endowment is still active today. Anna Garlin Spencer, a Providence philanthropist and philosopher, was asked to spearhead the creation of a new congregation using the chapel. She remained there ten years and was ordained by the congregation as the first female minister of any denomination in the State of Rhode Island.

At the present time, Rev. Frieda Gillespie serves as minister and Kristi Martel serves as music director. Services begin every Sunday morning at 10:00.

Bell Street Chapel was added to the National Register of Historic Places in 1973.

See also
 National Register of Historic Places listings in Providence, Rhode Island

References

External links
 Church web site

Churches completed in 1875
Unitarian Universalist churches in Rhode Island
Churches on the National Register of Historic Places in Rhode Island
Unitarian Universalism
Churches in Providence, Rhode Island
National Register of Historic Places in Providence, Rhode Island